The 1916 Texas Mines Miners football team was an American football team that represented the Texas School of Mines (now known as the University of Texas at El Paso) as an independent during the 1916 college football season. In their third year under head coach Tommy Dwyer, the team compiled a 2–3 record.

Schedule

References

Texas Mines
UTEP Miners football seasons
Texas Mines Miners football